Jorge Filipe Avelino Teixeira (born 27 August 1986) is a Portuguese professional footballer who plays for Belgian club Sint-Truidense V.V. as a central defender.

Club career

Born in Lisbon, Teixeira spent eight years in Sporting CP's youth system, but never appeared officially for its first team, being released in 2005 and spending his first two seasons as a senior in the third division, with Casa Pia A.C. and Odivelas FC, both hailing from the Lisboa Region. In 2007–08 he made his debut in the Segunda Liga, being relegated with C.D. Fátima.

Teixeira split the 2008–09 campaign between two teams in Cyprus, suffering relegation with Atromitos Yeroskipou. In summer 2009 he signed for Maccabi Haifa F.C. and, the following year, joined FC Zürich of Switzerland, who paid a fee of $1.2 million to the Israeli side.

On 20 July 2010, Teixeira made his Super League debut with his new club, scoring the opener in an eventual 3–2 away loss against FC Basel. In January 2013, he was loaned to Italy's A.C. Siena until June, starting in all his league appearances but being relegated from Serie A.

In May 2014, after helping Zürich capture the Swiss Cup in a defeat of FC Basel, Teixeira joined Standard Liége on a three-year contract to be made effective on 30 June. On 19 January 2016, however, he moved teams and countries again, signing a four-and-a-half-year deal with Charlton Athletic. His maiden appearance in the Championship occurred four days later, as he played the full 90 minutes in a 1–1 home draw with Blackburn Rovers.

On 15 July 2017, Texeira joined Sint-Truidense V.V. on a three-year contract.

References

External links

1986 births
Living people
Portuguese footballers
Footballers from Lisbon
Association football defenders
Liga Portugal 2 players
Segunda Divisão players
Sporting CP footballers
Casa Pia A.C. players
Odivelas F.C. players
C.D. Fátima players
Cypriot First Division players
Atromitos Yeroskipou players
AEP Paphos FC players
Israeli Premier League players
Maccabi Haifa F.C. players
Swiss Super League players
FC Zürich players
Serie A players
A.C.N. Siena 1904 players
Belgian Pro League players
Standard Liège players
Sint-Truidense V.V. players
English Football League players
Charlton Athletic F.C. players
Portuguese expatriate footballers
Expatriate footballers in Cyprus
Expatriate footballers in Israel
Expatriate footballers in Switzerland
Expatriate footballers in Italy
Expatriate footballers in Belgium
Expatriate footballers in England
Portuguese expatriate sportspeople in Cyprus
Portuguese expatriate sportspeople in Israel
Portuguese expatriate sportspeople in Switzerland
Portuguese expatriate sportspeople in Italy
Portuguese expatriate sportspeople in Belgium
Portuguese expatriate sportspeople in England